Quetzalia are a genus of flowering plants in the staff vine and bittersweet family Celastraceae, disjunctly distributed in Mexico, Central America, and Brazil. They can be trees, shrubs or lianas. Cyrus Longworth Lundell split them off from Microtropis in 1970, overriding his own 1939 findings.

Species
Currently accepted species include:
 
Quetzalia areolata (Lundell) Lundell
Quetzalia contracta (Lundell) Lundell
Quetzalia ilicina (Standl. & Steyerm.) Lundell
Quetzalia mayana (Lundell & L.O.Williams) Lundell
Quetzalia occidentalis (Loes. ex Donn.Sm.) Lundell
Quetzalia pauciflora Lundell
Quetzalia reynae Lundell
Quetzalia schiedeana (Loes.) Lundell
Quetzalia standleyi (Lundell) Lundell
Quetzalia stipitata (Lundell) Lundell

References

Celastraceae
Celastrales genera